"Livin' on Love" is a song written and recorded by American country music singer Alan Jackson.  It was released in August 1994 as the second single from his album Who I Am.  In late 1994, it became his ninth Number One hit on the Billboard country charts. It also reached number one on the Bubbling Under Hot 100.

Content
The song describes a couple who are "livin' on love". In the first verse, they are "two young people without a thing", while throughout the song they age, still in love with each other.

Critical reception
Thom Jurek of Allmusic described the song favorably, calling it "a mid-tempo honky tonker with killer fiddle, telecasters chopping up the middle, and lyrics that make its sentimental subject matter palatable." Kevin John Coyne of Country Universe gave the song a B+ grade, calling it "so catchy, so charming, and so full of little funny details." He goes on to say that he forgives Jackson for "ripping off 'Two Sparrows in a Hurricane' so blatantly."

Music video
The music video was directed by Piers Plowden and premiered in mid-1994.

Chart positions
"Livin' on Love" debuted on the U.S. Billboard Hot Country Singles & Tracks for the week of September 3, 1994.

Year-end charts

References

1994 singles
1994 songs
Alan Jackson songs
Songs written by Alan Jackson
Song recordings produced by Keith Stegall
Arista Nashville singles